The following list shows the music tracks that were featured in the Pirates of the Caribbean franchise (The Curse of the Black Pearl, Dead Man's Chest, At World's End, On Stranger Tides, Dead Men Tell No Tales) and other media created by the same team. The music was composed by George Bruns (attraction soundtrack), Klaus Badelt (film 1), Hans Zimmer (films 2-4) and Geoff Zanelli (5).

Pirates of the Caribbean: Theme Park Attraction

Walt Disney's Pirates of the Caribbean 

 "A Pirate's Journey"
 "Down with the Ship"
 "Cursed Treasure and Hearts"
 "Davy Jones' Locker"
 "Asleep in the Dirt"
 "The Captain's Deck"
 "Yo Ho (A Pirate's Life for Me)"

Pirates of the Caribbean: The Curse of the Black Pearl 
Pirates of the Caribbean: The Curse of the Black Pearl soundtrack, score, recording sessions, remixes are official release soundtrack albums from the film with the same title. The album was released in 2003, by Walt Disney Records and contains selections of music from the movie's score and some albums even never featured music. The music of the film and this album are both credited to composer Klaus Badelt and Hans Zimmer and producer Hans Zimmer.

Motion Picture Soundtrack

Remix Album

Pirates of the Caribbean: Dead Man's Chest 
Pirates of the Caribbean: Dead Man's Chest soundtrack, score, recording sessions, remixes are official release soundtrack albums from the film with the same title. The album was released in 2006, by Walt Disney Records and contains selections of music from the movie's score and some albums even never featured music. The music of the film and this album are both credited to composer and producer Hans Zimmer.

Motion Picture Soundtrack

Remix Album

Pirates of the Caribbean: At World's End 
Pirates of the Caribbean: At World's End soundtrack, score, recording sessions, remixes are official release soundtrack albums from the film with the same title. The album was released in 2007, by Walt Disney Records and contains selections of music from the movie's score and some albums even never featured music. The music of the film and this album are both credited to composer and producer Hans Zimmer.

Motion Picture Soundtrack

Remix Album

Unreleased Album

Pirates of the Caribbean: On Stranger Tides 
Pirates of the Caribbean: On Stranger Tides soundtrack, score, recording sessions, remixes are official release soundtrack albums from the film with the same title. The album was released in 2011, by Walt Disney Records and contains selections of music from the movie's score and some albums even never featured music. The music of the film and this album are both credited to composer Hans Zimmer and Rodrigo y Gabriela and producer Hans Zimmer.

Motion Picture Soundtrack

Pirates of the Caribbean: Dead Men Tell No Tales

Motion Picture Soundtrack

External links 
 Hans Zimmer's Official Site

Classical music soundtracks
Walt Disney Records soundtracks
List
music